Syringa chinensis can refer to:

Syringa × chinensis , the Chinese lilac
Syringa chinensis , a synonym of Syringa oblata  subsp. oblata